Margaret "Margie" Knickle is a Canadian curler from Nova Scotia. She represented Nova Scotia at the 1980 Canadian Ladies Curling Association Championship, finishing second. She represented Newfoundland and Labrador at the 1985 Scott Tournament of Hearts, finishing second.

References

Canadian women curlers
Curlers from Nova Scotia
Curlers from Newfoundland and Labrador
Living people
Year of birth missing (living people)